Sri Sri Radha Parthasarathi Mandir, generally known as the ISKCON Delhi temple, is a well known Vaishnav temple of Lord Krishna and goddess Radha in the form of Radha Parthasarathi. The Temple was inaugurated on 5 April, 1998 by the then Prime Minister of India Atal Bihari Vajpayee in the presence of former Chief Minister of Delhi Sahib Singh Verma and Sushma Swaraj. It is located at Hare Krishna Hills (near Nehru Place), in the East of Kailash area of New Delhi, India.

Temple Complex

ISKCON Temple, designed and built by Achyut Kanvinde who in 1993 agreed to accept a pro-bono commission to build this temple complex for the followers of Srila Prabhupada, is one of the largest temple complexes in India. It comprises numerous rooms for priests and for service renders. The temple also has a 375-seater auditorium which is used for cultural and religious functions. It has many halls that are used for its administration purposes and various seminars. It is divided into four broad sections.

Glory of India Vedic Cultural Centre 
The temple complex houses the Glory of India Vedic Cultural Centre, a popular destination for visitors and tourists to learn about major Hindu texts which are presented using various multimedia technologies, these include:

 Bhagavad Gita Animatronics - Using a blend of dramatic narration, lasers and projects, this show allows the visitors to learn the five major concepts of Bhagavad Gita, the three modes of nature and the Yoga systems presented therein.
 Mahabharat Experience - A light and sound show which presents the story line of Mahabharat which span over thousands of verses in a concise manner.
 Ramayana Art Gallery - A collection of over 30 original oil paintings painted by ISKCON's members from USA, Russia, India, UK.
 Bhagavat Puran Exhibit - This exhibit presents one of the most important text in the Vaishnava tradition in a visual format.

World's Largest Sacred Book 
The Glory of India Vedic Cultural Centre holds the 'Astounding Bhagavad Gita', which is the largest printed book of the major text of any world religion. The Italian printed 'Astounding Bhagavad Gita', weighs 800 kg and measures over 2.8 metres, was unveiled by the Prime Minister of India Narendra Modi on 26 February, 2019 in the presence of Tridandi Sannyasi Gopal Krishna Goswami and India's Culture Minister Dr Mahesh Sharma.

Gallery

See also
Vaishnavism
ISKCON Temple Chennai
ISKCON Temple Patna
ISKCON Temple Visakhapatnam
Gaudiya Vaishnavism
Svayam Bhagavan
 Delhi
noida

References

External links

ISKCON News: Official News Agency of ISKCON

1998 establishments in Delhi
International Society for Krishna Consciousness temples
Hindu temples in Delhi
Radha Krishna temples